The 1st Servis Hum Awards Ceremony (referred to as Hum Awards), presented by the Hum Television Network and Entertainment Channel (HTNEC) honour the best dramas of 2012 of Hum and to honour achievement in Fashion and Music. The ceremony took place on 12 March, 2013,  at the Expo Center in Karachi and was televised on 28 April 2013. During the ceremony, the Hum Channel presented Awards in 24 regular categories along with in 3 honorary and in 2 special categories. The ceremony was televised in Pakistan by Hum TV.

The events were hosted by Mikaal Zulfiqar, Mahira Khan, Vasay Chaudhry. During the ceremony, additional Honorary Awards were presented by host Bushra Ansari.

Shehr-e-Zaat won three awards including Best Drama Serial for Momina Duraid, Abdullah Kadwani & Asad Qureshi. Mere Qatil Mere Dildar won two awards, including Best Supporting Actress for Shagufta Ejaz. Sanjha won two awards including Best Director for Farooq Rind. Humsafar also won two awards. Mahira Khan won the Best Actress award for her role in Shehr-e-Zaat. Noman Ejaz won Best Actor for portraying the promising character in Bari Aapa.

Winners and nominees 
The nominees for public voting were announced on 20 February, 2013, and the rest of the categories were announced on 12 March 2013, through the official website of HUM TV and by Mikaal Zulfiqar Host of 1st Annual Hum Awards, and actress Mahira Khan. Seven categories were set to be open for voting by viewers.

Awards
Winners are listed first.

Television

Music

Fashion

Honorary Hum Awards 
Hosted by Bushra Ansari, the honorary awards in TV and Music categories are presented to Pakistani artists.

 Lifetime Achievement Award
 Moin Akhtar

 Hum Honorary Award in Music
 Ustad Rais Khan

 Hum Honorary Most Challenging Subject Award
 Razia Butt (Posthumous Award)
 Momina Duraid
 Haissam Hussain 
 Samira Fazal

 Hum Honorary Award in Television

 Nayyer Kamal 
 Zaheen Tahira  
 Munawer saeed  
 Badar Khalil 
 Qazi Wajid 
 Qavi Khan  
 Talat Hussain
 Anwar Maqsood  
 Shakeel  
 Abid Ali 

Hum Honorary Phenomenal Serial Award

 Momina Duraid
 Farhat Ishtiaq 
 Sarmad Sultan Khoosat 
 Mahira Khan
 Fawad Khan 
 Atiqa Odho 
 Naveen Waqar
 Hina Khawaja Bayat 
 Qaiser Naqvi
 Saba Faisal
 Sara Kashif 
 Noor Hassan Rizvi
 Qurat-ul-Ain Balouch 
 Waqar Ali 
 Naseer Turabi 
 Shehzad Kashmiri 
 Tanveer

Dramas with multiple awards and nominations 

The following 21 Dramas received multiple nominations:

The following four dramas received multiple awards:

Presenters and performers 

The following individuals were presented awards or performed musical numbers.

Presenters

Performers

Ceremony Information
The 1st Hum Awards were presented by Servis and powered by Telenor, Talk Shawlk and Nokia Lumia. The music was composed by Waqar Ali.
In addition to hosting, the co-host Vasay Chaudry was the script writer, arranger, and writer of the ceremony. The main hosts were nominated for Best Actor in a lead role and Best Actress in a lead role.

Voting Trend and Summary
Voting Trend for 1st Hum Awards was very genuine and authentic. Awards have both involvement of Jury and Audience. At launching of Hum Awards Shazia Ramzi announces the voting trend and Categories for which the actors were nominated.  Out of the 32 categories, seven categories are Viewers’ Choice. Voting for viewers’ choice was did through IVR, SMS & on Hum TV official Website from 20 February – 5 March 2013 (Voting and Nominations are closed now)
The other categories will be judged by a specialist jury and includes, Best On-Screen Couple for which Fawad Khan and Mahira Khan are nominees for their appearance in the extremely popular series, Humsafar among others.

Reception
The show received a mixed reception from media outlets and print publications, generally lauding Mahira Khan as a Host. People praise her much as a host. Mikaal also did a good job being doing a first full-fledged hosting. The whole ceremony was praised and watched by Pakistanis with full zenith, zeal and zest across the Globe.

Ali Pir Gul nomination
Pakistani comedian turned singer Ali Pir Gul was nominated at Hum awards in Music field but the team and management skips his nomination without knowing him which turned this news to a controversy.

See also 
 Lux Style Awards
 Nigar Awards
 Pakistan Media Awards
 PTV Awards
 Hum Awards
 Hum Awards pre-show
 List of Hum Awards Ceremonies

References

External links
Official websites
 Hum Awards official website
 Hum Television Network and Entertainment Channel (HTNEC)
 Hum's Channel at YouTube (run by the Hum Television Network and Entertainment Channel)
 Hum Awards at Facebook (run by the Hum Television Network and Entertainment Channel)

News resources
 1st Hum Awards The Express Tribune
 Hum Awards celebration Pakistan Today
 Hum Awards to go Live Urdu Wire

Analysis 
 2013 Hum Awards Winners list reviewit.com
 1st Hum Awards press release Media of Pakistan
 Hum Awards Reviews dramapakistani.com

2012 television awards
2012 music awards
Hum Awards
Hum Award winners
Hum Awards ceremonies